Šluknov is a town in Děčín District in the Ústí nad Labem Region of the Czech Republic. It has about 5,700 inhabitants. It lies on the border with Germany and it is the northernmost town of the country. The town centre with the castle and area of Křížový vrch are well preserved and are protected by law as an urban monument zone.

Administrative parts

The town part of Císařský and villages of Harrachov, Královka, Království, Kunratice, Nové Hraběcí and Rožany are administrative parts of Šluknov.

Geography
It lies in the salient region of Šluknov Hook on the border with Germany and is the northernmost town of the Czech Republic.

Šluknov is situated in the Lusatian Highlands. The territory is rich on small watercourses. The longest of them is Rožanský Stream. Other notable streams are Lesní, which supplies a set of ponds, and Stříbrný, which flows through the built-up area.

History

Early history
The first written mention of Šluknov is from 1281. The first owners was the noble family of Berka of Dubá. Under their administration, Šluknov became the administrative and economic centre of the Czech part of their estate. The family's coat of arms is to this day the inescutcheon in the town's coat of arms. In 1359, Šluknov was promoted to a town. 

During the reign of King George of Poděbrady, the property of Berka of Dubá was confiscated and Šluknov was acquired by Wartenberg family. Next owners of the estate were families of Schleinitz, Mansfeld, Dietrichstein, and Harrach. Before the town became independent, last owner of the estate was count Erwin Leopold Nostitz-Rieneck.

Šluknov was struck by many fires, the largest of them were in 1634, 1710 and 1838, when almost the whole town burned down. 

During the Thirty Years' War, the town was repeatedly severely damaged by Swedish army. In 1813, the town was plundered by a 100,000 man army during the Napoleonic Wars.

Until 1918, Schlukenau (Schluckenau since the end of the 19th century) was part of the Austrian monarchy (Austria side after the compromise of 1867), head of  the district of the same name, one of the 94 Bezirkshauptmannschaften in Bohemia.

Nazi era
In 1930, Schluckenau was home to 5,578 inhabitants who were largely ethnic German. Prior to the World War II, Schluckenau was a centre in Czechoslovakia for the pro-Nazist Sudeten German Party (SdP) led by Konrad Henlein. This was one reason why, in March 1939, Adolf Hitler chose the town as the first stop of the Wehrmacht during the German annexation of Sudetenland. The Wehrmacht continued on to occupy Prague and establish the Protectorate of Bohemia and Moravia. 

Following the invasion by the Wehrmacht some Czechs were driven out of Schluckenau into the interior of Bohemia. From 1938 until 1945 Schluckenau was the seat for the district administrator of the County of Schluckenau in the Nazist German Sudetenland, the district of Aussig.

Modern history
After the war, in 1945, the town returned to Czechoslovakia and the German inhabitants were expelled under the terms of Beneš decrees. The town was renamed Šluknov. Only a few Czechs were willing to settle in the remote northern Bohemian town following its vacancy.

Demographics
The town has a significant Romani population.

Economy
The town suffers from its location on the periphery of the Czech Republic. There is persistently high unemployment rate, low supply of services and poor quality of healthcare. Most industrial production has ended and revenues from tourism are insufficient.

Transport
In Rožany there is the road border crossing Šluknov-Rožany / Sohland an der Spree.

Šluknov lies on a local railway line from Děčín to Rumburk via Germany. The town is served by two train stations, and in the territory of Šluknov there is also a train station serving the adjacent village of Valdek.

Sights

The Renaissance Šluknov Castle is the main landmark of the town. It was built in the 16th century by Schleinitz family and it replaced an old keep from 1487. In the 17th century, baroque modifications were made. In 1986, Šluknov Castle was burned down. After twenty years of decay it was repaired. In addition to exhibition and event rooms located in the building, there is a tourist information office. The castle park is often used for public events.

Míru Square is the historic centre of the town. Its landmarks are the baroque Column of the Holy Trinity from 1751–1752 and an Empire style fountain from 1794.

The early-baroque Church of Saint Wenceslaus is the third church on its place. The previous were burn down by fires in 1634 and 1710 and the current church was built in 1711–1722.

The hill Křížový vrch is a valuable complex of sacral buildings, including Stations of the Cross, several chapels and statues. The complex was consecrated in 1756.

Notable people
Rudolf Kauschka (1883–1960), German-Bohemian sportsman and mountaineer

References

External links

 

Cities and towns in the Czech Republic
Populated places in Děčín District
Romani communities in the Czech Republic